Truncate selection may refer to:
 Truncation selection
 Non-random sampling